Hello World: The Motown Solo Collection is a 71-track triple disc box set commemorating Michael Jackson's early years with Motown Records. The album features Jackson's four solo LPs from Motown (dating from 1971 to 1975), plus songs that were released after he left the label.

Release dates
On June 12, 2009, Universal Music Group reissue label Hip-O Select announced on its Twitter page that the 3-CD set was available for pre-ordering, with an announced shipping date of July 3, the same date the set would be released to retail stores.

Track listing

Disc 1

Tracks 1–10 from the album Got to Be There
Tracks 11–20 from the album Ben
Track 18 contains a studio countdown not released on the original album.
Tracks 21 and 23 originally released on Anthology: The Best of Michael Jackson

Disc 2

Tracks 1–10 from the album Music & Me
The track order of 7–9 is different from the original release. 
Tracks 11–20 from the album Forever, Michael
Track 23 originally released on Anthology: The Best of Michael Jackson

Disc 3

Tracks 1–12 from the compilation Looking Back to Yesterday
Track 15 released in remixed form on The Original Soul of Michael Jackson
Tracks 16–24 from the compilation Farewell My Summer Love

References

External links
Hello World: The Motown Solo Collection on Hip-O Select

Michael Jackson compilation albums
Compilation albums published posthumously
2009 compilation albums
Hip-O Records compilation albums
Motown compilation albums